is a Japanese voice actress affiliated with I'm Enterprise. She took leading roles for each series, including Kamisama Minarai: Himitsu no Cocotama as Kokoro Yotsuba, Interviews with Monster Girls as Hikari Takanashi, Girlish Number as Yae Kugayama, Anime-Gatari as Minoa Asagaya, Katana Maidens ~ Toji No Miko as Kanami Eto, Comic Girls as Koyume Koizuka, Hinamatsuri as Hitomi Mishima, Zombie Land Saga as Sakura Minamoto, Bofuri as Maple/Kaede Honjō, and Wandering Witch: The Journey of Elaina as Elaina. She won the Best New Actress Award at the 13th Seiyu Awards.

Biography
Hondo was born in Aichi Prefecture. She had an interest in anime from a young age, in particular the Naruto series. She became interested in acting and modelling after an incident during her fifth year of elementary, when a woman came close to her saying she has "a face that goes well with makeup". Not knowing immediately what that should mean, she made some research on her own later, and came to believe she was told she has a face suitable for an actress or a model. She would then start auditioning for various acting and modelling jobs, but she did not initially consider voice acting as an option. As she had a desire to perform in front of people, upon entering high school, she joined her school's theater club. While in high school, Hondo acted in school plays and also participated in activities, such as swimming, basketball, soft tennis and softball. While in her third year of school, one of her instructors was a radio personality, and her experiences with them and the club influenced her to decide to become a voice actor. In pursuit of this career, she enrolled at the Japan Narration Actor Institute. After completing her training, she became affiliated with the voice acting agency I'm Enterprise. She made her voice acting debut in 2015, playing minor roles in series such as Aoharu × Machinegun. Later that year, she was cast in her first main role as Kokoro Yotsuba, the protagonist of the anime series Kamisama Minarai: Himitsu no Cocotama.

In 2016, Hondo played the roles for Keijo!!!!!!!! and Girlish Number; she and the other main cast members of Girlish Number also performed the series' opening theme "Bloom" and ending theme . The following year, she played the roles of Hikari Takanashi in Interviews with Monster Girls, Kon Tatsumi in Urara Meirocho, and Minoa Asagaya in Anime-Gataris. In 2018, she played the roles of Kanami Etō in Katana Maidens ~ Toji No Miko, Koyume Koizuka in Comic Girls, Hitomi Mishima in Hinamatsuri, Kohaku Tsukishiro in Iroduku: The World in Colors and Sakura Minamoto in Zombie Land Saga.

In 2019, at the 13th Seiyu Awards, Hondo was one of the winners of the Best New Actresses award.  The same year, she played the roles of Sempai in Magical Sempai, and Natsuki Saotome in Val × Love.  In 2020, she played the roles of Maple in Bofuri, and Elaina in Wandering Witch: The Journey of Elaina.  In 2021, she played the role of Laika in I've Been Killing Slimes for 300 Years and Maxed Out My Level, reprised the role of Sakura Minamoto in the second season of Zombie Land Saga, and also played the roles of Flora Beltrum in Seirei Gensouki: Spirit Chronicles, Hana Yurikawa in Mieruko-chan, Anna Schneider in Takt Op. Destiny, and Sumire Motiki in Deep Insanity: The Lost Child.

Filmography

Anime

Films

Video games

References

External links
Official agency profile 

1996 births
Living people
I'm Enterprise voice actors
Japanese video game actresses
Japanese voice actresses
Voice actresses from Nagoya
21st-century Japanese actresses